Ronald Glen Caveness (March 6, 1943 – May 10, 2014) was an American football linebacker for the American Football League's Houston Oilers and Kansas City Chiefs from 1965 to 1968.

Caveness played college football for the University of Arkansas where he was a Football News first-team All-American in 1963. In his senior season in 1964, he was selected first-team All-America by the American Football Coaches Association, the Associated Press, the Football Writers Association of America, the Newspaper Enterprise Association and The Sporting News.

Caveness led the Razorbacks to an undefeated season in 1964 (11-0), winning the Southwest Conference championship, and defeated Nebraska in the 1965 Cotton Bowl, 10–7. Caveness was the Defensive MVP of the Cotton Bowl. Arkansas was the only undefeated team left after the bowl games, and was named the 1964 national champions by seven different selectors. Alabama was awarded the AP Poll and UPI Coaches Poll national titles, but only because, at that time, both polls gave out their championships before the bowl games. Alabama lost in the Orange Bowl to the Texas Longhorns, a team Arkansas beat.

Caveness also spent the 1973 season as a linebacker coach for the Houston Oilers. He was inducted into the College Football Hall of Fame in 2010.

He died of melanoma at the age of 71 on 10 May 2014. After death he was diagnosed with chronic traumatic encephalopathy.

See also
List of American Football League players

References

1943 births
2014 deaths
American football linebackers
American football players with chronic traumatic encephalopathy
Arkansas Razorbacks football players
Kansas City Chiefs players
Houston Oilers players
College Football Hall of Fame inductees
American Football League players
Players of American football from Houston
Deaths from melanoma
Deaths from cancer in the United States